The Ministry of National Development exists in several countries:
 Ministry of National Development (Singapore)
 Ministry of National Development (Eritrea)

See also 
 List of public works ministries